Assaf Azo (born May 17, 1984) is an Israeli footballer who plays in Ironi Beit Shemesh

Honours
Third Division:
Winner (3): 2001–02, 2007–08, 2010–11

References

External links
 
 

1984 births
Israeli Jews
Living people
Israeli footballers
Hapoel Jerusalem F.C. players
Beitar Tel Aviv Bat Yam F.C. players
Hapoel Katamon Jerusalem F.C. players
Liga Leumit players
Footballers from Jerusalem
Association football midfielders